Emmanuel Ariwachukwu  (born 27 December 1993) is a Nigerian international footballer who plays for Saif SC in the Bangladesh Football Premier League, as a defender.

Club career
Born in Owerri, he has played club football for Gateway United, Calabar Rovers, Niger Tornadoes, Sheikh Jamal Dhanmondi, Akwa United and Churchill Brothers. In October 2018, he moved to Al-Hilal Club, having previously been vice captain at Akwa United. In January 2019 he spoke about his positive start with Al Hilal. He moved to Naft Maysan later that year, and FK Andijon in 2020. He joined Saif SC on 11 November 2020 in Bangladesh Football Premier League.

International career
He made his senior international debut for Nigeria on 19 August 2017 against Benin in a 2–0 win.

References

1993 births
Living people
Nigerian footballers
Nigeria international footballers
Gateway United F.C. players
Calabar Rovers F.C. players
Niger Tornadoes F.C. players
Sheikh Jamal Dhanmondi Club players
Akwa United F.C. players
Churchill Brothers FC Goa players
Al-Hilal Club (Omdurman) players
Naft Maysan FC players
FK Andijon players
Association football defenders
Nigerian expatriate footballers
Nigerian expatriate sportspeople in Bangladesh
Expatriate footballers in Bangladesh
Nigerian expatriate sportspeople in India
Expatriate footballers in India
Nigerian expatriate sportspeople in Sudan
Expatriate footballers in Sudan
Nigerian expatriate sportspeople in Iran
Expatriate footballers in Iran
Nigerian expatriate sportspeople in Uzbekistan
Expatriate footballers in Uzbekistan
Saif SC players
Nigerian expatriates in Bangladesh
People from Owerri
Sportspeople from Imo State